"(One Glance Is) Holy" is a single by English musician Mike Oldfield, released in 1989. It is from the album Earth Moving. Lead vocals are by Adrian Belew of the progressive rock band King Crimson. The single was only released in Germany, and contained four mixes of the song including an instrumental version.

Track listing 
 All tracks written by Mike Oldfield.
 "(One Glance Is) Holy" (Hard and Holy mix) – 4:49
 "(One Glance Is) Holy" (Remix) – 3:45
 "(One Glance Is) Holy" (Edit) – 3:36
 "(One Glance Is) Holy" (Holy Groove Instrumental) – 4:46

References 

1989 singles
Mike Oldfield songs
Songs written by Mike Oldfield
1989 songs
Virgin Records singles